The Bacardi Building (Edificio Bacardí) is an Art Deco  Havana landmark designed by the architects Esteban Rodríguez-Castells and Rafael Fernández Ruenes and completed in 1930. It is located on the corner of Calles Monserrate and San Juan de Dios on a 1,320 sq meter lot in Las Murallas, Old Havana.

History
The Bacardi Building was designed to be the headquarters for the Bacardi Rum Company; it was nationalized by the Castro government in the early 1960s. In 2001, the building was restored by an Italian construction firm. The interior retains the original decorations in marble and granite. It is regarded as one of the finest Art Deco buildings in Latin America.

Architecture

The building was the outcome of an architectural design competition. The owners of the Bacardi company invited a number of architects to present their design proposals for a new headquarters building offering 1,000 pesos to the winner. The competition was made up of a panel of judges that included Henri Schueg Chassin, president of Bacardi, and the architects Leonardo Morales y Pedroso, the architect for Colegio Belen, Enrique Gil, Emilio de Soto, and Pedro Martínez Inclán. The first prize was awarded to architects Esteban Rodríguez-Castells and Rafael Fernández Ruenes. José Menéndez Menéndez was the architect-engineer in the project.

Construction of the building started on January 6, 1930, and was completed by the 300-day deadline the company had set for December. Poor conditions of the land required that the foundation use piles of hardwood (jiqui and júcaro negro) and high strength concrete. At the peak of the building (47m) is a bronze sculpture of the company logo, a fruit bat. Its design gives the building a unique chromatic effect and a decorative element of Catalan modernism. At the brim of the building are inflected flat panel sculptures of sirens.

The first floor contained a bar with column archways where patrons of the restaurant in the mezzanine area could overlook the bar while they dined. It was open to the public and known to have many celebrities who frequented. Most of the marble and granite were imported from Europe: Germany, Sweden, Norway, Italy, France, Belgium and Hungary.

With an area of 1,075 sq. meters and 7.25 meters of support, the first floor walls, floor, and ceiling are adorned in pink granite from Bavaria, and the two halls are of green marble from floor to ceiling. The construction work was carried out by the company Grasyma of Wansiedel, Bavaria of Germany, which took great care in the fine details of the work and the time-sensitivity of the project deadline.

Construction was completed in December 1930 and at the time it was the tallest building in Havana.

Gallery

See also

List of buildings in Havana

Notes

References

See also

López Serrano Building

Buildings and structures in Havana
Art Deco architecture
Bacardi
Office buildings completed in 1930
Architecture in Havana
20th-century architecture in Cuba